The Turkish Women's Volleyball Cup, is a national cup for professional women's volleyball in Turkey, organized by the Turkish Volleyball Federation since the 1994-95 season. Between 2003 and 2008, the event was not held five consecutive seasons. The cup was sponsored in 2012-13 season by Teledünya, a digital cable TV and internet service owned by Türksat.

Most successful team of the Turkish Women's Volleyball Cup are Eczacıbaşı with nine titles followed by Vakıfbank with eight titles.

Champions

Source:

Performance by club

MVP by Edition
 2014 - 
 2015 - 
 2017 - 
 2018 - 
 2019 - 
 2021 - 
 2022 -

See also
 Men's
Turkish Men's Volleyball League
Turkish Men's Volleyball Cup
Turkish Men's Volleyball Super Cup
 Wome's
Turkish Women's Volleyball League
Turkish Women's Volleyball Cup
Turkish Women's Volleyball Super Cup

References

External links
Turkish Volleyball Federastion official web page

Women's Cup
Cup
Recurring sporting events established in 1994
1994 establishments in Turkey